The action of 3 February 1812 was an unusual minor naval engagement off the western coast of Haiti between a British frigate and a frigate manned by a loose coalition of Haitian rebels. The battle was fought against the background of the Napoleonic Wars and the collapse of government in Haiti in the aftermath of the Haitian Revolution eight years earlier. After the French had been expelled from Haiti in 1804, the newly independent nation was first ruled by Jean-Jacques Dessalines, who was murdered in 1806 and replaced by two of his advisors, Henri Christophe and Alexandre Pétion. These rulers divided the country between them and in the confused political situation that followed a number of minor fiefdoms appeared, including one led by Jérôme Maximilien Borgella in the south-west of the island called Sud. The small Haitian Navy defected to Borgella, who crewed the vessels with a collection of sailors from various countries, led by a notorious privateer named Gaspard.

Stationed off Haiti was the British frigate HMS Southampton under Captain Sir James Lucas Yeo, tasked with observing the political situation but with orders not to interfere in the intermittent conflict between Christophe and Pétion. Yeo's orders did not include Borgella's ships and Yeo reasoned that the Haitian flagship, the large frigate Heureuse Réunion (recently renamed from Améthyste and often reported under its former name), presented a serious threat to international trade in the region.

Sailing to intercept the Haitian ship, Yeo discovered her in the Gulf of Léogane and ordered Gaspard to surrender. The Haitian refused, and the frigates exchanged shots at 06:30. The superior seamanship and discipline on Southampton prevented Gaspard from boarding the British ship with his greater numbers and within half an hour Heureuse Réunion was dismasted and battered. At 07:45 the Haitian ship surrendered, Yeo depositing the crew ashore and bringing Heureuse Réunion to Port Royal, Jamaica. At Jamaica, his actions were approved by his superiors and Heureuse Réunion, renamed Améthyste, was returned to Henri Christophe.

Background
During the Napoleonic Wars, the Caribbean Sea was initially an important theatre of naval conflict, as ships operating from the various French, British, Spanish and Dutch colonies preyed on enemy trade. During 1809 and 1810 however, the Royal Navy launched a series of co-ordinated amphibious operations that eliminated the French and Dutch colonies and brought the conflict in the Caribbean to an end. With the threat of attacks on British trade in the region significantly reduced, the Royal Navy correspondingly reduced their presence in the Caribbean and the remaining British ships were distributed to observe trouble spots in the region, which in 1812 included the independent nation of Haiti.

Haiti had won its independence from France in 1804, the first Caribbean nation to do so. The Haitians had fought a lengthy and bloody war against the French known as the Haitian Revolution, in which armies of former slaves led by Toussaint Louverture and then Jean-Jacques Dessalines succeeded in driving the French into their fortified ports and then systematically eliminating their enclaves. With the start of the Napoleonic Wars in 1803, French reinforcements for the garrison on Haiti were delayed and intercepted by the British Royal Navy, who blockaded the island and took the surrenders of the last garrisons in 1804, removing them and their dependents to prevent a massacre. Dessalines rapidly established himself as monarch of Haiti, but his reign was cut short in 1806 when his closest advisors, Henri Christophe and Alexandre Pétion organised his assassination. Assuming control of Haiti, Christophe laid claim to the northern part of the country and Pétion the south, the two sides waging a constant low-level civil war during the next decade. Many minor rulers sprang up during this period, especially in the south, where Pétion gave parcels of land for his followers to establish their own private fiefdoms. One such warlord was Jérôme Maximilien Borgella, who took over command of a small state in the region of Léogane following the death of its ruler, André Rigaud.

In early 1809, the French sent a number of reinforcement convoys to their blockaded colonies in the hope of strengthening the garrisons before the British invasions began. Many ships, including four frigates, were lost in these missions and few reached their destinations successfully. Among these failed attempts was Troude's expedition to the Caribbean, which arrived in April 1809 at the Îles des Saintes. Finding that Guadeloupe was the only surviving colony, Amable Troude intended to anchor at Basse-Terre and unload his supplies, but was blockaded in the Îles des Saintes by a British squadron under Vice-Admiral Sir Alexander Cochrane. Attempting to break out on 14 April, Troude led his main squadron northwest towards Puerto Rico while two en flûte frigates slipped out northeast to Basse-Terre, arriving safely. Troude's squadron was defeated on 17 April, but the frigates Félicité and Furieuse remained at Basse-Terre until 14 June, when they attempted to break out and return to France, laden with trade goods. The British blockade squadron were soon in pursuit and on 18 June the frigate HMS Latona captured Félicité without a fight. Furieuse was captured a month later in the North Atlantic. Félicité was 24 years old and was therefore considered too antiquated for commissioning in the Royal Navy; instead she was sold to Henri Christophe to form the nucleus of the new Haitian Navy under the name Améthyste.

Battle
At some point in January 1812 the Haitian Navy defected, for reasons unknown, from Christophe to Borgella. Borgella placed a noted French privateer named Gaspard in command of the squadron, which included the frigate Améthyste  (renamed Heureuse Réunion), a corvette and a brig. Gaspard then armed Heureuse Réunion with 44 cannon, took on board a motley crew of over 600 men, a mixture of Haitian, French, American and other nationalities, and began cruising in the Gulf of Gonâve. The British observer off Haiti at this time was Captain Sir James Lucas Yeo in the frigate HMS Southampton, under strict orders to respect the flags of Christophe and Pétion, but not those of the minor warlords that had emerged along the coast. On 2 January word reached him at Port au Prince of Gaspard's movements and he immediately sailed to intercept him, concerned that if Gaspard was allowed to take his powerful squadron out of Haitian waters he might begin attacks on merchant ships regardless of nationality.

At 06:00 on 3 February, Yeo discovered Gaspard's ships at anchor to the south of the island of Guanaboa and demanded that Gaspard come aboard Southampton with his commissioning papers, to establish under whose authority Gaspard commanded the warship. The Haitian captain refused, but sent aboard his first lieutenant with a note purported to be from Borgella, signed "Borgellat, general in chief of the south of Hayti". As Borgella had no authority to commission warships, Yeo ordered the lieutenant to tell Gaspard that his ships must submit to Southampton and be taken to Port Royal, Jamaica, where their ownership could be established by the naval authorities. He would have five minutes to consider the proposal. A British officer accompanied the Haitian lieutenant back to Heureuse Réunion for Gaspard's answer, and was informed within three minutes that Gaspard had no intention of submitting to the British ship. He was also told that should Yeo be intent on fighting the Haitian ship then he should indicate it with a bow gun fired ahead of Heureuse Réunion. Returning to Southampton at 06:30, the lieutenant relayed the message and the bow gun was fired, followed a few seconds later by a full broadside from Southampton.

Heureuse Réunion responded to the cannonade in kind. During the engagement, Gaspard repeatedly attempted to board Southampton, where his vastly superior numbers could overwhelm the British crew. Yeo was aware of his enemy's intentions, and repeatedly manoeuvered out of the way, his more disciplined and agile vessel easily able to remain out of contact with the overloaded Haitian ship. Within half an hour the highly efficient gunners on Southampton had knocked down the main and mizen masts on Heureuse Réunion, leaving her unable to manoeuvre and vulnerable to repeated pounding at close range. Despite the severe damage the Haitian ship suffered, her crew continued to fire cannon at irregular intervals for 45 minutes, each shot prompting a broadside from the British ship. The two smaller Haitian vessels did not support the frigate, fleeing towards Maraguana near Petit Goâve to shelter under the batteries there. By 07:45, after over an hour of heavy fire, Yeo hailed Heureuse Réunion to discover whether or not she had surrendered. Somebody aboard replied that they had, although Gaspard had been seriously wounded and was no longer in command, so the identity of the person who gave the surrender is not known.

Aftermath
As Southampton stopped firing, the remaining masts of the Haitian ship fell overboard. Casualties on Heureuse Réunion were immense: of the 600–700 crew, 105 were dead and 120 wounded, the latter including Gaspard, who subsequently died of his injuries. Yeo's loss was one man killed and ten wounded, from a crew of 212. Seeking to rid himself of so many prisoners, Yeo landed most of them at Maraguana before sailing to Port au Prince, where the rest were landed and temporary jury masts were fitted to Heureuse Réunion for the journey to Jamaica. The British retained 20 prisoners for trial at Port Royal. Heureuse Réunion was repaired at Jamaica and subsequently restored to Christophe under the name Améthyste, returning to Haitian service. Yeo's action in attacking the Haitian ship, although not officially sanctioned by his commanding officer beforehand, was commended.

The Caribbean rose in importance again later in 1812, with the outbreak of the War of 1812 between Britain and the United States. American privateers threatened British trade routes and Royal Navy ships were sent out to defeat them, including Southampton, which was wrecked in the Bahamas during an anti-privateer patrol in November 1812. There were no further significant actions in the region during the Napoleonic Wars, the presence of Royal Navy patrols deterred any large scale French or American operations in the Caribbean.

Notes

References
 
 
 
 
 
 
 
 

Military history of Haiti
Naval battles involving the United Kingdom
Naval battles involving Haiti
Conflicts in 1812
Battles involving Haiti
February 1812 events